Giovanni da Santo Stefano da Ponte (1306–1365) was an Italian painter, active in his native Florence. He was a pupil of Buonamico Buffalmacco, and painted portraits and devotional subjects. He worked at Arezzo.

References

1306 births
1365 deaths
Trecento painters
14th-century Italian painters
Italian male painters
Painters from Florence
Gothic painters